Kand Halan (also Romanized as Kand Halān, Kand Helān and Kandehlān; also known as Kandelān, Kandelan, Kandlān, and Khiāndelan) is a village in Jowkar Rural District, Jowkar District, Malayer County, Hamadan Province, Iran. At the 2006 census, its population was 563, in 123 families.

References 

Populated places in Malayer County